The Origin of Fire, Op. 32, is a cantata composed by Finnish composer Jean Sibelius and premièred on 9 April 1902 at the opening of the National Helsinki Theatre, conducted by the composer. It was later revised in 1910. The idea behind the cantata is taken from the Finnish national epic, the Kalevala. Some of the sketches for the piece can be related back to 1893/94.

Originally scored for baritone, men's chorus and orchestra, the piece begins sombrely with the soloist narrating the first part of the story. Andrew Barnett writes:

The land of Kalevala is in darkness because the Mistress of Pohjola has captured the Sun and the Moon, and stolen fire from Kalevala's homes.  Ukko, chief of the gods, searches for them in vain. The second part is faster and has the story taken up by the choir. In this Ukko creates new fire and entrusts it to the Maiden of the Air, who drops it. ... It would be easy to apply an allegorical interpretation to this Kalevala text. Finland under Russian rule could be said to be experiencing perpetual darkness – reason enough for the Finnish people to emulate Ukko and seek out new light.

Recordings

In 1953, the piece was recorded by Remington Records in an early stereo recording by the Cincinnati Symphony Orchestra, conducted by Thor Johnson, with baritone Sulo Saarits and the Helsinki University Chorus. The recording was reissued by Varèse Sarabande.

References

External links 
 

Compositions by Jean Sibelius
1902 compositions
Cantatas
Music based on the Kalevala